Langston University (LU) is a public land-grant historically black university in Langston, Oklahoma. It is the only historically black college in the state. The university is a member-school of the Thurgood Marshall College Fund.

History
The school was founded in 1897 and was known as the Oklahoma Colored Agricultural and Normal University. From 1898 to 1916 its president was Inman E. Page. Langston University was created as a result of the second Morrill Act in 1890. The law required states with land-grant colleges (such as Oklahoma State University, then known as Oklahoma A&M) to either admit African Americans, or provide an alternative school for them to attend as a condition of receiving federal funds. The university was renamed as Langston University in 1941 in honor of John Mercer Langston (1829–1897), civil rights pioneer, first African-American member of Congress from Virginia, founder of the Howard University Law School, and American consul-general to Haiti.

Through the years, Langston University has developed slowly but surely. Some of the most serious problems have been political influences, financial stress, and lack of adequate space and equipment. During the 1960s, the campus underwent a complete makeover. New buildings appeared, and additions were made to the library and auditorium.

Poet Melvin B. Tolson taught at Langston from 1947 until 1964. Tolson was portrayed by Denzel Washington in the film The Great Debaters.

In August 2021, university President Kent J. Smith Jr. announced the university would use COVID-19 relief money to forgive the debt of students enrolled between spring 2020 and summer 2021, forgiving $4.65 million in student debt.

Academics

Six schools house the degree programs of Langston University: Agriculture and Applied Sciences; Arts and Sciences; Business; Education and Behavioral Science; Nursing and Health Professions; and Physical Therapy. A total of 29 undergraduate and six graduate degree programs are offered at LU.

The university offers the Edwin P. McCabe Honors Program for highly motivated undergraduate students with exceptional academic records.

The university was accredited with a Doctorate of Physical Therapy (DPT) program in 2005. It is the university's only doctoral program and one of two DPT programs in the state.

Langston University is accredited by the Higher Learning Commission. Several programs are accredited by accreditors specific to that discipline.

Athletics
The Langston athletic teams are called the Lions. The university is a member of the National Association of Intercollegiate Athletics (NAIA), primarily competing in the Sooner Athletic Conference since the 2018–19 academic year. The Lions previously competed as a member of the Red River Athletic Conference (RRAC) from 1998–99 to 2017–18. They were also a member of the Southwestern Athletic Conference (SWAC) from 1931–32 to 1956–57, which is currently an NCAA Division I FCS athletic conference.

Langston competes in nine intercollegiate varsity sports: Men's sports include basketball, football and track & field; while women's sports include basketball, cheerleading, cross country, softball, track & field and volleyball.

There is also a co-ed club soccer program. The present athletic director is Donnita Rogers. The Lions won the 1939 and 1941 HBCU National Championships in football. Langston won two HBCU National Championships in basketball in 1944 and 1946.

Marching Pride

Langston's marching band is known as the "Langston University Marching Pride". It is a major ambassador of the university, a supporter at athletic events, and serves as a training center for students interested in pursuing a career in music and/or developing pertinent life skills.  Charlie Wilson, of The Gap Band, once served as Drum Major.  The band currently consists of over 210 members.  Langston also has a jazz band, concert band, wind ensemble, Bahamian band, and trombone ensemble.

, the band has won three bids to the Honda Battle of the Bands in the Georgia Dome since the inaugural event in 2003.

Notable alumni

See also
KALU, Langston U. Public Radio Station 89.3 FM

References

External links
 
 Official athletics website

 
Educational institutions established in 1897
Red River Athletic Conference
Historically black universities and colleges in the United States
Land-grant universities and colleges
Public universities and colleges in Oklahoma
African-American history of Oklahoma
Education in Logan County, Oklahoma
Buildings and structures in Logan County, Oklahoma
1897 establishments in Indian Territory
Universities and colleges accredited by the Higher Learning Commission